The 2017 Dunlop Endurance Championship is a motor racing championship for GT cars, touring cars and sportscars held across England. The championship's field consists of varying types of cars from production cars to sportscars & GTs that compete in five classes, in two categories, depending on horsepower, momentum, etc. This is the 15th season of a Britcar championship. For 2018, race one includes all cars of every class, while there are two separate race lengths and finishes, although the E class and S class cars compete in the same race, Sprint cars run for 50 minutes, Endurance for 120. one for the Sprint class and one for the Endurance.  The season began on the 14th of April at Rockingham and ended on the 18th of November at Brands Hatch.

Calendar

Teams and drivers

{|
|

Results

Championship Standings

(key)

References

External links
 

2017 in British motorsport
Endurance motor racing
Britcar Endurance Championship seasons